52nd Brigade or 52nd Infantry Brigade may refer to:

 52nd Indian Brigade of the British Indian Army in the First World War 
 52nd Infantry Brigade (United Kingdom)
 52nd Anti-Aircraft Brigade (disambiguation)

See also

 52nd Division (disambiguation)